Ghost Stories Live 2014 is the fourth live album by the British alternative rock band Coldplay. It is a live recorded version of the band's sixth studio effort Ghost Stories, being released by Parlophone in the United Kingdom on 24 November 2014. A DVD from one of the concerts that was filmed at Sony Studios, Los Angeles in March 2014, is included in the package. 

The performance was previously shown on NBC, however, it differs from the TV special, as it only includes performances of the songs from Ghost Stories, while the special featured only six songs from the album, with the other three being replaced by the band's previous hits "Clocks", "Viva la Vida" and "Paradise". 

It was filmed by director Paul Dugdale in a custom-built amphitheatre at Sony Studios, Los Angeles, according to the band's official website. The ground-breaking production sets the band's performance against 360-degree and overhead imagery. The live recording of the album received a Best Music Film nomination at the 57th Annual Grammy Awards.

Recording
"Always in My Head", "Midnight" and "A Sky Full of Stars" were recorded on 1–2 July 2014 at the Royal Albert Hall, London. "Magic" and "True Love" were recorded on 19 June 2014 at Enmore Theatre, Sydney.
"Ink" was recorded on 28 May 2014 at Paris Casino, Paris. "Another's Arms" was recorded on 5 May 2014 at Beacon Theatre, New York City. "Oceans" was recorded on 25 April at E-Werk, Cologne. "O" was recorded on 19 May 2014 at Royce Hall, Los Angeles.

Track listing 
All tracks written by Guy Berryman, Jonny Buckland,  Will Champion, and Chris Martin, except "A Sky Full of Stars" (co-written by Tim Bergling).

CD

DVD

Personnel
Coldplay
Jonny Buckland – electric guitar, keyboard, piano, backing vocals
Guy Berryman – bass guitar, keyboard, laser harp
Will Champion – drums, reactable, electric guitar, Ebow, vocals
Chris Martin – lead vocals, acoustic guitar, piano, laser harp

Production
Coldplay – producer
Rik Simpson – producer, engineer
Ted Jensen – mastering engineer

Charts

Weekly charts

Year-end charts

Certifications

Release history

See also
 
Coldplay Live 2003
Coldplay Live 2012
Live in Buenos Aires

References

External links
Coldplay official website

Coldplay live albums
Coldplay video albums
2014 live albums
2014 video albums
Atlantic Records live albums
Concert films
Parlophone live albums